In molecular biology, Small nucleolar RNA SNORA62 (E2) belongs to the H/ACA class of snoRNAs.

E2 is involved in the processing of eukaryotic pre-rRNA and has regions of complementarity to 28S rRNA.
E2 is encoded in introns in the gene for a laminin-binding protein.

This family also contains the related ACA6, M2 and MBI-136 snoRNAs.

References

External links 
 

Small nuclear RNA